Araschnia oreas is a  butterfly found in the Palearctic that belongs to the browns 
family. It is endemic to East Tibet and West China

Description from Seitz

oreas Leech (64f) is perhaps only a seasonal form of the preceding [Araschnia davidis] , with narrower bands and lines, which have partly a yellowish tint; near the edge of the hindwing a row of blue elongate spots. The underside more brightly marked, the ground colour being almost red. West China: Wa-ssu-kow, Chow-pin-sa, Pu-tsu-fong.

References

Araschnia
Butterflies described in 1892